Algeria, participated at the 1965 All-Africa Games held in the city of Brazzaville, Congo-Brazzaville.

Medal summary

Medal table

Medalists

References

Nations at the 1965 All-Africa Games
1965
1965 in Algerian sport